Kurza may refer to:
Kurza, India
Kurza, Iran
Kurza, Poland
Kurza, Hebron